A Minnesota presidential primary has been held five times: 1916, 1952, 1956, 1992 and 2020. The state of Minnesota has normally held presidential caucuses instead. On May 22, 2016 Minnesota Governor Mark Dayton signed a bill that reinstated a presidential primary starting in 2020.

1916

The first Minnesota presidential primary was held on Tuesday, March 14, 1916. Along with the Democratic and Republican parties, the Prohibition Party also held a primary. The Progressive Party (Bull Moose) was eligible to hold an election but no candidates filed.

Winners
Democratic Party: Woodrow Wilson
Prohibition Party: William Sulzer
Republican Party: Albert B. Cummins

1952

The second Minnesota presidential primary was held on Tuesday, March 18, 1952.

Winners
Democratic Farmer Labor Party: Hubert Humphrey "favorite son candidate"
Republican Party: Harold Stassen

1956

The third Minnesota presidential primary was held on Tuesday, March 20, 1956.

Winners
Democratic Farmer Labor Party: Estes Kefauver
Republican Party: Dwight Eisenhower

1992

The fourth Minnesota presidential primary was held on Tuesday, April 7, 1992. The closed primary was binding for the Independent- Republicans Party, but for the Democratic Farmer Labor Party it was only a "beauty contest" as the DFL awarded its delegates at March 3 caucuses to Senator Tom Harkin of Iowa.

Winners
Democratic Farmer Labor Party: Bill Clinton
Independent Republican Party: George H. W. Bush

2020

The fifth Minnesota presidential primary was held on Tuesday, March 3, 2020.  However, controversy over the Republican Party of Minnesota excluding challengers to President Trump sparked a legal challenge by James Martin, a voter and Rocky De La Fuente, a presidential candidate jeopardizing the Minnesota Secretary of State from being able to print the ballots for both the Democratic and Republican primary elections.  Ultimately, the Minnesota Supreme Court ordered Minnesota's primary to continue as planned, leaving the incumbent president as Republican voters' only option.  Two other major parties, the Grassroots-Legalize Cannabis Party and the Legal Marijuana Now Party did not hold a primary.

Winners
Democratic Farmer Labor Party: Joe Biden
Republican Party: Donald Trump

References

External links
includes 1916 results
1952 results
1956 results
1992 results
2020 results

+Primary